Esquimalt and Nanaimo Railway Roundhouse in Victoria, British Columbia, was completed in 1913 and designated a historic building in 1992.
The roundhouse has been virtually unchanged since its construction. It is surrounded by railway shops and outbuildings, representative of the steam railway era in Canada, once serving its namesake railway.

See also 
 Island Rail Corridor
 List of historic places in Victoria, British Columbia
 Railway turntable

References

External links 
 The Roundhouse

1913 establishments in British Columbia
Buildings and structures in Victoria, British Columbia
Buildings and structures on the National Historic Sites of Canada register
National Historic Sites in British Columbia
Railway roundhouses in British Columbia
Transport infrastructure completed in 1913